This is a list of the NCAA Division I men's basketball tournament Final Four participants (a third-place game was played from 1946 to 1981).

Participants

Teams marked with an * vacated its Final Four appearances due to violations of National Collegiate Athletic Association (NCAA) rules aimed at preserving the integrity and amateur status of its student athletes.

Appearances by team

Notes
All schools are identified in this list by their current athletic brand names. This most notably affects the following institutions:
 The University of Memphis made its first Final Four appearance in 1985 as Memphis State University.
 The University of Texas at El Paso, athletically branded and academically marketed as UTEP, made its lone appearance in 1966 when the institution was known as Texas Western College.
 The University of North Carolina at Charlotte, athletically branded as Charlotte since 2000, used "UNC Charlotte" and "UNCC" interchangeably when it made its sole Final Four appearance in 1977.
 The University of Connecticut adopted its long-used short form of "UConn" as its sole athletic brand name in 2013–14, the same season in which it won its most recent national title.

Teams marked with an asterisk (*) have had at least one of the marked appearances vacated due to NCAA sanctions.

Appearances by state

Final Four appearances by region

U.S. Census Regions Map

Final Four, Final Two and champs by region

Updated as of 4/2/2018

Note: The table includes vacated results indicated by "*" in the main table.

 St. Joseph's, 1961: Three players involved in a point-shaving scandal.
 Villanova, 1971: Tournament Most Valuable Player Howard Porter had signed a professional contract with the Pittsburgh Condors of the American Basketball Association (ABA) during the regular season.
 Western Kentucky, 1971: Jim McDaniels had signed a professional contract with the Carolina Cougars of the American Basketball Association and accepted money during the regular season.
 UCLA, 1980: Kiki Vandeweghe and Rod Foster were declared ineligible due to their connection with recruiting violations involving booster Sam Gilbert.
 Memphis State (now Memphis), 1985: Leading scorer Keith Lee had received $40,000 in illegal payoffs from head coach Dana Kirk.
 The University of Michigan vacated the results of 113 games won while four players (Chris Webber, Maurice Taylor, Robert Traylor and Louis Bullock) were not eligible, including the 1992 and 1993 Final Fours. See University of Michigan basketball scandal.
 Massachusetts, 1996: Marcus Camby had accepted money and gifts from a pair of sports agents.
 Minnesota, 1997: Academic fraud involving head coach Clem Haskins, five other university employees and at least eighteen players. See University of Minnesota basketball scandal.
 NCAA gave Ohio State three years' probation and ordered it to pay back all tournament money earned from 1999–2002 when Boban Savović was on the Buckeyes' roster. Ohio State had to remove all references to team accomplishments from those years including a 1999 visit to the Final Four.
 Memphis had its entire 2007–08 season vacated by the NCAA due to issues related to star guard Derrick Rose, whose SAT score was invalidated after the 07–08 season.
 Louisville vacated the results of 126 games (123 wins, 3 losses) from 2011 to 2015, a period in which several unnamed players were ineligible. This included the 2012 Final Four and 2013 national title. See 2015 University of Louisville basketball sex scandal.
 2021 marks the first time in history that all four Final Four teams are located west of the Mississippi River.

References

College men's basketball records and statistics in the United States
Participants